Edward Martin Smith (born June 5, 1969) is a former American football tight end who played for the NFL's Atlanta Falcons, Philadelphia Eagles, and Detroit Lions from 1997 to 1999. Prior to that, Smith played baseball in the minor league systems of the Chicago White Sox, Milwaukee Brewers, Chicago Cubs, and Cleveland Indians. His nephew is Irv Smith Jr., tight end for the Minnesota Vikings and his brother is Irv Smith, also a former NFL tight end.

High school and baseball career
Smith grew up in the Browns Mills section of Pemberton Township, New Jersey and played football and baseball at Pemberton Township High School before being drafted by the White Sox in the 7th round of the 1987 MLB Draft. He declined football scholarships to Penn State and Florida to begin his professional baseball career out of high school, and played in the White Sox minor league system from 1987 to 1991. He then played for the Brewers system from 1991 to 1993, the Cubs system in 1994, and the Indians system in 1995. His baseball career peaked at the Triple-A level in 1995 and ended following that season at age 26. Primarily a third baseman, Smith also played at first base and in the outfield later in his career.

Football career
Smith then began a career in professional football, playing at tight end with the Frankfurt Galaxy of the NFL Europe in 1996. He was signed to the Washington Redskins practice squad as a free agent in August 1996 where he remained for the rest of the season. In 1997, he was signed to the Atlanta Falcons practice squad and was promoted to the team's active roster during the season. His first game in uniform was against a New Orleans Saints team that included his brother, Irv. The brothers would again be on opposing teams in 1998, with Irv playing for the San Francisco 49ers. Smith won an NFC championship with the Falcons in 1998. He split the 1999 NFL season between the Philadelphia Eagles and Detroit Lions, and his NFL career ended following that season. Smith then played for the Birmingham Thunderbolts of the XFL during the league's only season in 2001.

Later life
The EZ Sports Talk Show debuted on the Phoenix, AZ airwaves on June 4, 2011. Smith launched the show live on KXXT 1010AM in Phoenix. The show was also streamed live on 3 websites and available on podcast as well. The EZ Sports Talk Show aired for 2+ years on KXXT. During a brief hiatus, Smith maintained his presence as a radio personality in the Phoenix area and was also featured in some national spots. On March 4, 2017, EZ Sports Talk was relaunched on NBC Sports Radio KDUS, 1060AM. The show is broadcast live every Saturday from 10:00am – noon, hosted by Smith and his partner Jim Marshall.

The EZ Sports Talk Show format features a weekly in-depth look at the local sports landscape, in addition to national storylines and hot topics. Smith's background, with 9 years of minor league baseball and 6 years of professional football, has provided him with a unique knowledge and expertise of the sports world. Paired with Marshall's superior baseball knowledge and overall passion for Arizona sports, the duo provide great content. 
 
Smith is also a motivational/inspirational speaker. He shares his inspirational message with audiences across the country and around the globe. With speeches tailored to leaders, youth sports, and business executives, Smith shares insights and lessons from his life journey and pro sports career to help others focus their energy on achieving their goals and increasing performance.

References

External links
 Minor league baseball career statistics at Baseball-Reference
 Football career statistics at Pro-Football-Reference and The Football Database

1969 births
Living people
People from Pemberton Township, New Jersey
Atlanta Falcons players
Philadelphia Eagles players
Frankfurt Galaxy players
Detroit Lions players
American football tight ends
South Bend White Sox players
Sarasota White Sox players
Birmingham Barons players
Stockton Ports players
Beloit Brewers players
El Paso Diablos players
Orlando Cubs players
Canton-Akron Indians players
Buffalo Bisons (minor league) players
Players of American football from Trenton, New Jersey
Baseball players from Trenton, New Jersey
Birmingham Thunderbolts players